Banikane  is a village and commune of the Cercle of Gourma-Rharous in the Tombouctou Region of Mali. The village lies on the right bank of the River Niger, 25 km downstream of Rharous. The commune extends on both banks of the river and includes 15 villages. In the 2009 census the population of the commune was 9,433.

References

External links
.
.

Communes of Tombouctou Region